Pseudoliparis may refer to:

 A genus of orchids, considered synonymous with Malaxis.
 Pseudoliparis, a genus of snailfishes.